is a Japanese variant of chadō ("way of tea"). It involves the preparation and drinking of sencha green tea, especially the high grade gyokuro type.

History 

Towards the end of the 17th century in the Edo period, Chinese merchants visiting Nagasaki showed how brewed tea should be drunk, as practised in the Ming dynasty court. This practise of the Chinese tea culture spread in the 18th century until the beginning of the Meiji era, particularly among literati merchants, in the form of friends meeting in a less formal atmosphere than the chanoyu. Appreciation of painting and literacy objects then took on particular importance. These meetings, often followed by genuine meals, were the opportunity to admire the host's collections, most often composed of objects imported from China or made in Japan in Chinese style called karamono.

In difference to the preparation of matcha tea, which is powdered, sencha is prepared using small leaf tea.

Similarly to the Chinese Gongfu tea ceremony, senchadō has a codified form of preparation, presentation and enjoyment of tea.

In spring 2020 the Aichi Prefectural Ceramic Museum in cooperation with Meiji-mura held a large sencha exhibition about Kimura Teizo, an outstanding art collector born in Nagoya. His collection of 3,307 items was donated to the Aichi Prefectural Museum of Art, including modern and contemporary art, Edo period paintings, tea pottery, Buddhist art and archaeological relics.

Utensils 

Senchadō uses utensils which are necessary to perform tea. Some of them are used in macha tea as well. Different schools will sometimes use different names for the same item, and also use some of the items listed but not necessarily all of them:
 Mat (茶具褥) that is placed in the room and delineates the work area
 Stove (凉爐)
 Stove equipment:
 Furnace fan (爐扇)
 Feather broom (羽帚)
 Fire chopsticks (火箸 Hibashi)
 Tank holder (bottle) (罐座 Kama-za)
 charcoal (烏府 Karasu-fu)
 Fire screen (爐屏 Robyō)
 Tea kettle made out of pottery (保宇夫良)
 Tea kettle (水注 Mizu chū)
 Waste water receptacle (建水 Kensui)
 Chaire (茶心壺 Tea container)
 Tea scoop (仙媒)
 Chakin (茶巾 "tea cloth") is a small cloth used to wipe the chawan
 Kintō (巾筒 "cloth tube") is a small tube or vessel used to store the chakin during use
 Kyūsu (急須) is a small teapot
 smaller kyusu with no handle (泡瓶)
 small vessel to cool water (湯冷)
 Chawan (煎茶碗 "tea bowl"), normally a small-sized cup made out of porcelain and glazed in white
 Wantō (碗筒 "bowl tube") is a tube or container normally made out of woven bamboo, to store the small chawan tea cups
 Tea cup coasters, made out metal, wood or lacquer (煎茶托 Chataku or 瓶床) 
 Tray (盆)
 Censer (香爐 Kōro)
 Incense tube (綫香筒)
 Tea banner (茶旗)
 Curtain to the room (帳)
 Tea container (茶櫃 Chaki)
 Utensils box (提籃) 
 Tea board (茶盤)
 Tea cabine (茶局)
 Stand (棚)

See also 
 Bunjinga
 Bunjinbana

References

External links 

 一般社団法人　全日本煎茶道連盟
 Sencha Brewing (Senchado)

Chadō